John Brenan may refer to:
John Brenan (bishop) (died 1693), Irish Roman Catholic archbishop
Ryan Brenan (John Ryan Brenan, 1798–1868), Australian politician
John Brenan (physician) (1768–1830), Irish physician
John Fitzgerald Brenan (1883–1953), British diplomat in China
John Patrick Micklethwait Brenan (1917–1985), British botanist

See also
John Brennan (disambiguation)
Michael John Brenan (1780–1847), Roman Catholic priest and ecclesiastical historian